Jean-Christian Bourcart (born 1960) is a French artistic photographer and film maker. He collected unsold wedding pictures, photographed in brothels and S&M cubs, photographed New Yorkers stuck in traffic jams, projected pictures of Iraqi victims on American houses, churches and supermarkets, wrote and published his autobiography and documented lengthy the city of Camden, NJ, one of the poorest and most dangerous city in the USA. He also directed two fiction feature movies, the first one during the war in Bosnia, the second, a sci-fi thriller in New York art world, starring the awards-winner Elodie Bouchez. He is also an active video filmmaker. Nine books about his work have been published. He has been teaching and conducting workshops all along his career. In 2021, all his archives were deposited at the musée Nicephore Niepce in Chalon-sur-Saône in France. 

Awards:
Nadar Prize, Paris, 2011
Nominated for Pictet prize 2010 & 2011, ICP awards 2010, BMW award 2010
Niepce Prize, Paris 2010
Prix du du Jeu de Paume, Paris, 2006
Prix Gilles Dusein, Paris,1999
Prix d’interprétation masculine, “Premiers Plans,” Festival de Belfort,1997
Prix du Jury, Festival d’Annecy 1997
World Press Awards, categorie Art, Amsterdam, 1991
Prix Polaroïd, 1984

Solo exhibitions (selection)
2021 "Au bord du reél," Fondation M.R.O, Arles
"F.S.A., l'inconscient de Roy Stryker," 8 Belze,Arles
2020 "Black Sheet," Manifesto Festival, Toulouse
2019 "L'oiseau noir perché à droite dans ma tête", Fisheye Galerie, Paris
2018 "Une excuse pour regarder," Musée Nicéphore Nièpce, Chalon sur Saône
2017    "Day of Wrath, " Fisheye Gallery, Paris, France
"Humano Todavia," Valenzuela Klenner Gallery, Bogota, Colombia
"Camden," Chongqing festival, China
2016    "Camden," International Photographic festival, Chengzhou, China
"The dawn came but no day", Festival "Portraits," Vichy
"Camden," International Photographic festival , Zhengzhou, China

2015    "All about Love," galerie VU', Paris

2014	"All about Love," Black Box Gallery, Brooklyn, USA

2013	‘’Camden," Invisible Dog Art center, Brooklyn, USA

"Exerts,"Roger Williams University, Bristol, USA
" Tana," French Institute, Antananarivo, Madagascar
 2012 Shanghai Gallery of Art, China
Galerie Le Manège, Institut français, Dakar, Sénégal 
Caochangdi PhotoSpring, Beijing, China
Le bleu du ciel Art Center, Lyon, France
 2011‘’Kailash," Galerie VU’, Paris
Galerie Confluence, Nantes
‘’Kailash," Hôtel Fontfreyde, Clermont Ferrand
Images - Festival des arts visuels de Vevey
 2010	"Camden", Museum für  Photographie Braunschweig
"10th International photo Exhibition," Shanghai
"Camden", Images - Festival des arts visuels de Vevey
 2009: "Camden", Rencontres Internationales d’Arles
 2008: "Le plus beau jour de la vie," Rencontres Internationales d’Arles
 2007: "Stardust", Andrea Meislin Gallery, New York; Musée du Jeu de Paume, Paris; "Stardust," Chrysler Museum, Norfolk,
 2006: "Traffic," Museu da Imagem, Braga, Portugal
 2006: "Traffic", Fototeca, Monterrey, Mexico	
 2004: "Traffic", Galerie Léo Scheer, Paris
 2002: "Le plus beau jour de la vie", Kagan Martos Gallery, New York
 2001: "Forbidden city", galerie Catherine Bastide, Bruxelles
 2000: Galerie du Jour, Paris
 1993: "Les filles de la gare centrale," Galerie Urbi & Orbi, Paris

Filmography
 2017: "KLCK28," HDV, 3min40
 2016: "Take my money," HDV 3min15
 2015:Tahrir sqare/Unpeakable, HDV, '' 8min 34, CrossEyed Production
 2011:  ‘’Fortune Tellers," HDV, 12min, CrossEyed Production
 2010: "Memories of the days to come" 35mm, 80 min, Le Bureau production
 2008: "Encore une fois," DV, 4 min. 30
 2007: "Stardust, the film," DV, 1 min. 30
 2006: "Me, my cell and I’,"  DV, 9 min
 2005: "It’s today", DV, 7 min; "The decisive act," DV, 8 min. 30; "Stories of hell," DV, 6 min. 15
 2004: "Rapture," DV, 10 min. 30; "Bardo/Autoportrait," DV,  5min. 15
 2003: "Videhole," DV, 2 min. 30
 1999: "(de) la fenêtre," vidéo, 26 min D.A.P, Ministère de la Culture et de la Communication
 1997: "Elvis," fiction movie, 35 mm, 65 min,Lazennec Production
 1996: "Céline en galère," video, 46 min, Io Production
 1993: "Casablanca," video  with Robert Frank, 8 min
 1992: "Les filles de la gare centrale," vidéo, 12 min

Bibliography
1. Monographies
2019 "L'oiseau noir perché à droite dans ma tête," éditions Le Bec en l'air
 2014	 "All About Love," Loco editions Paris, Bizarre éditions New York
 2011	"Camden," Images en Manœuvre éditions
 2008	"Sinon la mort te gagnait", Point du jour éditions
 2004	"Traffic", Leo Scheer editions, interview by Brigitte Ollier
 2002	"Madones Infertiles," text by Nan Goldin, TDM édition
 1999	"Forbidden City," text by Régis Jauffret, interview by Brigitte Ollier, Le point du jour éditeur
 1998	"C’était cinq heures du soir,"  text by Jean Rolin, Le point du jour éditeur

2. Periodicals
 ‘’Le goncourt de la photo‘’ in La dépêche du midi, January 2012
 "Kailash,‘’ by Dominique Baqué in Art Press, September 2011
 ‘’Kailash‘’, in l’Humanite, p.19, May 2011
 ‘’Kailash‘’, in Le Monde, P.43, April 2011 
 ‘’The Most Beautiful Day, ‘’ in British journal of Photography, P.46-53, March 2011
 "Camden, USA," in Usbeck &Rica, p. 54-65, winter 2010
 "Traffic," in Zoom, by Cristina Franzoni, p. 102-104
 "Photographier la misère comme un exorcisme," by Armelle Canitrot in La Croix,  p. 14, August 17, 2009
 "Sinon la mort," by Jacques Henric in Artpress nº351, p 74, December 2008
 "J’aime franchir les frontières", Interview in "le Monde", July 12, 2008
 "Collateral," in Esquire, Russia, Dec. 2007
 "Stardust," by Robert Stevens in Next Level, Spring 2007
 "Jean-Christian Bourcart, images violentes", by Hélène Simon in Le Monde, May 4, 2007
 "Qu’est-ce que la photographie aujourd’hui ?", by Brigitte Ollier in Beaux Arts éditions p. 62-63, May 2007
 "Stardust," by Vince Aletti in The New Yorker, February 19 & 27,  2007
 "Se raconter que tout est illusion," interview by Frédéric Bonnet in Le Journal des Arts, Dec. 1, 2007

Prizes
 2011 Nadar prize for best photographic book for Camden
 2010 Niépce Prize, Paris
 2006 Prix du du Jeu de Paume, Paris
 1999 Prix Gilles Dusein, Paris
 1997 Prix d’interprétation masculine, "Premiers Plans," Festival de Belfort
 1997 Prix du Jury, Festival d’Annecy
 1991 World Press Awards, categorie Art,  Amsterdam
 1984 Prix Polaroïd

References

External links
 Jean-Christian Bourcart Official Website
 Jean-Christian Bourcart @ Photography-now.com

French photographers
Living people
1960 births